Hosín is a municipality and village in České Budějovice District in the South Bohemian Region of the Czech Republic. It has about 900 inhabitants.

Administrative parts

The village of Dobřejovice is an administrative part of Hosín.

History
The first written mention of Hosín is from 1330.

Sights
The main landmark is the Church of the Saints Peter and Paul. The original was built in the 11th or 12th century. In the 13th century, when this sacral building was no longer sufficient for its spatial capacity, a new, early Gothic church was built, in which the former church was incorporated as a sacristy. In the 1890s, the church was extended and rebuilt in the Neo-Romanesque style.

Other sights include:
Baroque rectory from the 18th century
Stone wayside shrine from 1636 along the road towards Hluboká nad Vltavou, with the coat-of-arms of the former estate owner, Baltasar Marradas
Former china clay mine Orty, a natural monument
Memorial to those killed in World War I
Houses built in the Folk Baroque style

References

Villages in České Budějovice District